San Ruffino is a village in Tuscany, central Italy, administratively a frazione of the comune of Casciana Terme Lari, province of Pisa. At the time of the 2001 census its population was 72.

San Ruffino is about 35 km from Pisa and 4 km from Lari.

References 

Frazioni of the Province of Pisa